KTLO-LD (channel 46) is a low-power television station in Colorado Springs, Colorado, United States, affiliated with the Spanish-language Telemundo network. It is owned by the News-Press & Gazette Company (NPG) alongside ABC affiliate KRDO-TV (channel 13) and radio stations KRDO (1240 AM) and KRDO-FM (105.5). The four stations share studios on South 8th Street in Colorado Springs, where KTLO-LD's transmitter is also located.

Due to its low-power status, KTLO-LD's broadcast range only covers the immediate Colorado Springs area. Therefore, it is simulcast in 720p high definition on KRDO-TV's second digital subchannel in order to reach the entire market. This signal can be seen on channel 13.2 from a transmitter on Cheyenne Mountain.

Subchannel

References

External links

TLO-LD
Television channels and stations established in 1990
1990 establishments in Colorado
Low-power television stations in the United States
Telemundo network affiliates